Rafael Villanueva (1947–1995) was a Dominican musician born in Santo Domingo, Dominican Republic. He attended The Royal Conservatory of Music in Toronto, Canada from 1966 to 1972. He served as principal conductor the Dominican National Symphonic Orchestra from 1994 to 1995. He is the 1978 El Dorado Award winner.

References

1995 deaths
The Royal Conservatory of Music alumni
1947 births
Dominican Republic conductors (music)
Male conductors (music)
20th-century conductors (music)
20th-century male musicians
People from Santo Domingo